The Ambassador and Permanent Representative of the Philippines to the United Nations is the head of the diplomatic mission of the government of the Philippines to the United Nations.

List of Permanent Representatives

See also
 Filipinos in the New York metropolitan area

References

Lists of Permanent Representatives to the United Nations
Permanent Representatives of the Philippines to the United Nations